Misfit Garage is a  Discovery Channel reality-television show spun off from Fast N' Loud.  It features two of the mechanics fired from that show's Dallas, Texas-based Gas Monkey Garage, Tom Smith and Jordan Butler, as well as Thomas Weeks and Scot McMillan, who together start a new company, Fired Up Garage. The series, which premiered October 13, 2014, is produced by Pilgrim Studios, with Craig Piligian, Richard Rawlings and Eddie Rohwedder as executive producers, and Craig Coffman additionally serving as executive producer for the Discovery Channel.

Series overview

Episodes

Season 1
Season one started on October 13, 2014.

Season 2 
Season two started on March 23, 2015.

Season 3 
Season three started March 7, 2016.

Season 4 
Season four started on July 11, 2016

References

 

2014 American television series debuts
2010s American reality television series
Discovery Channel original programming
Automotive television series
American television spin-offs
Reality television spin-offs